The Buenos Aires-class destroyers were a group of destroyers built for the Argentine Navy in Britain in the 1930s.

Design

The ships were based on the contemporary G-class destroyers building for the British Royal Navy, with some modifications to suit Argentine requirements.

After World War II these ships were modified by installing two single hand-worked  Bofors guns between the funnels replacing the original anti-aircraft machine guns, and two twin air-cooled Bofors unique to the Argentine and Swedish navies (instead of the more common water-cooled mounts) replacing the after bank of torpedo tubes. Radar and sonar was also fitted at this time and Santa Cruz landed "B" gun in favor of a pair of Hedgehog anti-submarine weapons. Anti-submarine weaponry was further improved with 4 throwers and 2 stern tracks.

Ships

Operational history 
ARA Corrientes collided with cruiser ARA Almirante Brown in the fog during naval exercises and sank on 3 October 1941, 54 nm northeast of Mar del Plata. 

On 19 September 1955, San Luis, San Juan and Entre Rios supported cruiser ARA Nueve de Julio when the latter  shelled and destroyed fuel depots at the port of Mar del Plata, in the course of the Revolucion Libertadora. The destroyers' fire kept at bay a group of armed civilians and soldiers attempting to storm the local naval base. Some civilian property was damaged. The destroyer force also shelled the headquarters of the Army Antiaircraft School, north of the city, some hours later.

See also 
 List of ships of the Argentine Navy
 Mendoza-class destroyer

References

Notes

Bibliography

External links 
  Destroyers ("Destructores (Tambien llamados Torpederos)") – Histarmar website (accessed 2017-02-04)

Destroyer classes
 
World War II destroyers of Argentina
Argentina–United Kingdom military relations